John A. Mullen (died 1972) was an American judge who served as a justice on the New York Supreme Court.

References 

1972 deaths
Year of birth missing
New York Supreme Court Justices
20th-century American judges